Holmes Moss Alexander (January 29, 1906 – December 5, 1985) was an American historian, journalist, syndicated columnist, and politician, originally from Parkersburg, West Virginia.

The son of Charles Butler Alexander, an insurance official, and Margaret (née Moss), Alexander was educated at Princeton (B.A. 1928) and Trinity College, Cambridge (1928-9). He worked as an English teacher and wrestling coach in Maryland until 1931.

From 1931 to 1935, Alexander was a member of the all-Democratic delegation from Baltimore County to the Maryland House of Delegates.

Typical of Alexander's newspaper columns was one that he wrote on  Democratic Governor George Wallace of Alabama, who when term-limited in 1966 ran his wife, Lurleen Burns Wallace, as a surrogate gubernatorial candidate, against Republican U.S. Representative James D. Martin. Known for his opposition to school desegregation, Wallace procured passage of a series of state laws promptly struck down by federal courts, which required the implementation of Brown v. Board of Education. Alexander writes: "Though Wallace has lost every fight with Washington, Alabamians are convinced he has come off the winner."

Alexander's books include The American Talleyrand:  Martin Van Buren (1935), Aaron Burr: The Proud Pretender (1937), American Nabob (1939), and Selena: A Romantic Novel (1941). Other Alexander works include Pen and Politics: The Autobiography of a Working Writer, How to Read The Federalist, To Covet Honor: A Biography of Alexander Hamilton, The Spirit of '76, Washington and Lee: A Study in Will to Win, Seattle: Growth of the City, Tokyo: Growth of the City, Hong Kong: Growth of the City, Beijing: Growth of the City, Shanghai: Growth of the City, and Vancouver, British Columbia: The Growth of the City/State. His last publication, Never Lose a War: Memoirs and Observations of a National Columnist, was released in 1984, the year before his death.

His maternal uncle, Hunter Holmes Moss, Jr., was a circuit judge and then a Republican member of the United States House of Representatives from West Virginia from 1913 until his death in 1916.

Alexander was married to the former Mary Morgan Barksdale; they had two sons and a daughter. He resided in Owings Mills in Baltimore County, Maryland, where he is interred at Saint Thomas Episcopal Church Cemetery.

References

1906 births
1985 deaths
Historians of the United States
American male journalists
American columnists
American non-fiction writers
Politicians from Parkersburg, West Virginia
People from Owings Mills, Maryland
Democratic Party members of the Maryland House of Delegates
20th-century American historians
American male non-fiction writers
20th-century American politicians
20th-century American male writers
Christians from West Virginia
20th-century American Episcopalians
Historians from Maryland